Pleurodema marmoratum is a species of frog in the family Leptodactylidae.
It is found in Argentina, Bolivia, Chile, and Peru.
Its natural habitats are subtropical or tropical high-altitude shrubland, subtropical or tropical high-altitude grassland, rivers, swamps, freshwater marshes, intermittent freshwater marshes, arable land, pastureland, and irrigated land.

References

Pleurodema
Amphibians of Argentina
Amphibians of Bolivia
Amphibians of Chile
Amphibians of Peru
Taxonomy articles created by Polbot
Amphibians described in 1841